French Polynesia's third constituency is a French legislative constituency in French Polynesia.  It is represented by Moetai Brotherson of Tavini Huiraatira.

It was created in the 2010 redistricting of French legislative constituencies, which came into application for the June 2012 legislative election.
It contains part of Tahiti (Faaa and Punaauia) and all the Leeward Islands (Bora-Bora, Huahine, Maupiti, Tahaa, Taputapuatea, Tumaraa and Uturoa).

Deputies

Election Results

2022

 
 
|-
| colspan="8" bgcolor="#E9E9E9"|
|-

2017

2012

References

3